Yukarıbalcılar is a village in the Pervari District of Siirt Province in Turkey. The village is populated by Kurds of the Şakiran tribe and had a population of 434 in 2021.

References 

Villages in Pervari District
Kurdish settlements in Siirt Province